The International Pentecost Holiness Church (or IPHC) is one of the largest African initiated churches in Southern Africa. The church was founded in Meadowlands, Soweto, in 1962 by Frederick S Modise. The church's headquarters is at Silo in the town of Zuurbekom; visitors were encouraged to make a monthly pilgrimage to Silo and Modise.

References

African initiated churches
Pentecostal denominations
Organizations established in 1962